Samuel Žbogar (born 5 March 1962) is a Slovenian diplomat and politician who is the EU Special Representative in North Macedonia. He served as Minister of Foreign Affairs of Slovenia from 2008 to 2012. He is currently acting Minister for Development Cooperation.

Biography
He was born in Postojna, but spent his youth in Nova Gorica, where he finished the local grammar school, where he was a school mate of the former Prime Minister of Slovenia Borut Pahor. Žbogar graduated in international relations from the Faculty of Social Sciences of the University of Ljubljana. Besides Slovene, he is fluent in Serbo-Croatian, English, Italian and French.

In his 22 years as a diplomat, he has been included in all major political projects of Slovenian foreign policy. In 1993, he opened the Slovenian Embassy in Beijing, China, where he worked to 1995. Between 1997 and 2001, he was Deputy Ambassador to the United Nations and the Deputy of Slovenia's Permanent Representative to the UN Security Council during Slovenia's elected membership in 1998 and 1999. At the time, Slovenia's representative was Danilo Türk, who later served as President of Slovenia. Between 2001 and 2004, he was State Secretary at the Ministry of Foreign Affairs in the cabinets of Janez Drnovšek and Anton Rop. During this period, he supported the strengthening of the humanitarian aspect of foreign policy and led the project group for the preparation of Slovenia's Organization for Security and Co-operation in Europe presidency. In 2004, he was appointed Ambassador to the United States. He was also a member of the EU membership negotiation group and the main negotiator for NATO membership.

After returning from Washington, D.C. in October 2008, he became the Director of the Institute for Strategic Studies in Ljubljana. In November 2008, he was named Minister of Foreign Affairs in the centre-left government of Borut Pahor. In December 2011, Catherine Ashton, the European Union's (EU) High Representative of the Union for Foreign Affairs and Security Policy, appointed Žbogar the head of the EU's office in Kosovo and as the special representative of the EU. This is the first Slovenian high-ranking official in the European External Action Service (EEAS).

References 

1962 births
Living people
Slovenian diplomats
Foreign ministers of Slovenia
People from Nova Gorica
Ambassadors of Slovenia to the United States
European Union diplomats
University of Ljubljana alumni
Slovenian officials of the European Union